Xus may refer to:

The plural of Xu, see Xu (disambiguation)
An autonym for the Tolowa people
A contraction of Christus